Sabriya is a 1997 film.

Sabriya is part of the project "Africa Dreaming", a chronicle of Africa in six acts, six contemporary stories which share the theme of love. They are psychological of social dramas presented in the specific cultural and traditional contexts of each of the six countries represented: South Africa, Zimbabwe, Namibia, Mozambique, Mauritania and Senegal.

Synopsis 
The film explores the impact of the modern world on the traditional male society of the Maghreb. It is a film about men who prefer to live life as an abstract game and the free-spirited woman who changes all that.

External links 

1997 films
Malian short films
Tunisian short films
1997 romantic drama films
Malian drama films
Tunisian drama films